Gars or GARS may refer to:

Places
Gars am Inn, a municipality Bavaria, Germany
Gars Abbey, a monastery founded in 768 in Gars am Inn
Gars, Alpes-Maritimes, a commune in the Alpes-Maritimes department in southeastern France
Gars am Kamp, a market town in the district of Horn in Lower Austria

Other
Glycine—tRNA ligase, an enzyme encoded by the GARS gene
Global Area Reference System, a geospatial reference system for use across the US Department of Defense

See also
Gar (disambiguation)